Creston may refer to:

Places

Canada 
 Creston, British Columbia, a town in the Regional District of Central Kootenay
 Creston (electoral district), a provincial electoral district
 Creston Formation, a formation cropping out in Newfoundland
 Creston, Newfoundland and Labrador a town in Burin peninsula

United States 
 Creston, California, an unincorporated place in San Luis Obispo County
 Creston, Napa County, California, an unincorporated place in Napa County
 Creston, Illinois, a village in Ogle County
 Creston, Indiana, an unincorporated place in Lake County
 Creston, Iowa, a city in Union County
 Creston station
 Creston, Kentucky, an unincomuunity community
 Creston, Louisiana, an unincorporated community on Black Lake in Natchitoches Parish
 Creston, Nebraska, a village in Platte County
 Creston, New Jersey, an unincorporated community in Hamilton Township, Mercer County
 Creston, North Carolina, an unincorporated community in Ashe County
 Creston, Ohio, a village in Medina and Wayne counties
 Creston, Oregon
 Creston, South Dakota, an unincorporated community
 Creston, Washington, a town in Lincoln County
 Creston, West Virginia
 Creston Township (disambiguation)
 Creston Subdivision, a railroad line owned by CSX Transportation in the U.S. State of South Carolina
 Creston (Amtrak station)

Elsewhere 
 Creston (Macedonia), a town in ancient Macedonia, Greece

People
 Paul Creston (1906–1985), American composer of classical music
 René-Yves Creston (1898–1964), Breton artist, ethnologist and French Resistance activist during World War II

Other uses
 Creston (apple), an apple cultivar
 Creston Electric Instruments, a producer of electric guitars and basses

See also
 Crestone (disambiguation)
 Creston High School (disambiguation)